Cyperus schimperianus is a species of sedge that is native to Africa and the Arabian Peninsula.

The species was first formally described by the botanist Ernst Gottlieb von Steudel in 1854.

See also
 List of Cyperus species

References

schimperianus
Plants described in 1854
Taxa named by Ernst Gottlieb von Steudel
Flora of Ethiopia
Flora of Eritrea
Flora of Chad
Flora of Cameroon
Flora of Egypt
Flora of Saudi Arabia
Flora of Kenya
Flora of Malawi
Flora of Sudan
Flora of Tanzania
Flora of Uganda